John Sheldwich I (died after 1411), of Canterbury, Kent, was an English politician.

Family
Sheldwich was the son of John Sheldwich of Canterbury, also an MP. Before 1402, Sheldwich married a woman named Agnes. They had a son, John, who also was MP for the city, and one daughter.

Career
Sheldwich was a Member of Parliament for Canterbury, Kent in 1399 and 1402.

References

14th-century births
15th-century deaths
People from Canterbury
English MPs 1399
English MPs 1402